

Public General Acts

|-
| {{|Northern Ireland Budget Act 2019|public|30|31-10-2019|maintained=y|archived=n|An Act to authorise the issue out of the Consolidated Fund of Northern Ireland of certain sums for the service of the year ending 31 March 2020; to appropriate those sums for specified purposes; to authorise the Department of Finance in Northern Ireland to borrow on the credit of the appropriated sums; and to authorise the use for the public service of certain resources (including accruing resources) for that year.}}
|-
| {{|Historical Institutional Abuse (Northern Ireland) Act 2019|public|31|05-11-2019|maintained=y|archived=n|An Act to establish the Historical Institutional Abuse Redress Board and to confer an entitlement to compensation in connection with children who were resident in certain institutions in Northern Ireland; and to establish the Commissioner for Survivors of Institutional Childhood Abuse.}}
}}

References

Lists of Acts of the Parliament of the United Kingdom